The 1951 King's Birthday Honours in New Zealand, celebrating the official birthday of King George VI, were appointments made by the King on the advice of the New Zealand government to various orders and honours to reward and highlight good works by New Zealanders. They were announced on 7 June 1951.

The recipients of honours are displayed here as they were styled before their new honour.

Order of the Companions of Honour (CH)
 The Right Honourable Sidney George Holland – Prime Minister of New Zealand.

Knight Bachelor
 The Honourable Arthur Fair  – of Auckland; senior puisne judge of the Supreme Court.

Order of Saint Michael and Saint George

Knight Commander (KCMG)
 William John Polson – of Fordell. For public and political services.

Order of the British Empire

Dame Commander (DBE)
Civil division
 Elizabeth May Gilmer  – of Wellington. For distinguished service in civic and community affairs.

Commander (CBE)
Civil division
 Ernest James Fawcett  – of Wellington; director-general of agriculture, Department of Agriculture.
 Bernard Edward Murphy – of Wellington; professor of economics, Victoria University College, 1920–1950. For services to education.
 John Porteous Rutherford – of Wellington; controller and auditor-general, Audit Department.
 Leonard Owen Howard Tripp  – of Wellington. For patriotic and social welfare services.

Officer (OBE)
Civil division
 Thomas William Mark Ashby – of Auckland. For municipal services.
 Hugh Blake Burdekin – of Levin. For services to returned servicemen.
 Alfred Edward Caddick – of Christchurch. For services to education, dramatic art and sport.
 William Reynolds Carey – of Christchurch. For services to the community.
 Letty Mabel Croft – of Napier; matron and lady superintendent, Napier Public Hospital.
 James William Dove  – of Dunedin. For services to the community, especially in local-government affairs.
 Hugh Charles Jenkins – of Wanganui. For services to journalism.
 Kenneth Ewart Luke  – city engineer, Wellington.
 Thomas James Maling – of Christchurch. For services to the community.
 Harry Montefiore Wilson  – of Hastings; a medical practitioner.

Military division
 Commander Alexander Cochrane Swanson   – Royal New Zealand Naval Volunteer Reserve.
 Lieutenant-Colonel Edward Trevor Kensington  – Royal New Zealand Artillery.
 Squadron Leader Grevis Goetz – Royal New Zealand Air Force.

Member (MBE)
Civil division
 Morris John Barnett – of Christchurch. For services to horticulture. 
 William Bringans – of Alexandra. For services to local government.
 Alexander Christie Cameron  – of Dunedin. For services to the community in Dunedin.
 John Wiltshire Card – of Featherston. For services to local government.
 Norman Royle-Chapman  – of Auckland. For services in connection with various public and patriotic organisations.
 Herbert Peachey Desmoulins – of Dunedin. For patriotic services, especially in connection with the Food for Britain campaign.
 Agnes Marshall Ferguson – of Auckland. For services to the New Zealand Red Cross Society.
 Harry Cecil Alderson Fox – of Hāwera. For services to music.
 Thomas Threader Garland – of Auckland. For services to the community, especially as a conductor of children's choirs.
 John Guiniven – of Takapuna. For municipal services.
 Elizabeth Catherine Gunn  – of Wellington; a former director of the School of Hygiene, Wellington. For public services.
 Annie Henry – of Ōhope. For services rendered under the auspices of the Presbyterian Māori Mission to the Māori people.
 Margaret Jane McKerrow – of Hampden. For services to the community.
 Stella Murray – of London. For social welfare services on behalf of New Zealanders in the United Kingdom.
 Alexander James Nicol – of Gisborne. For public and social welfare services.
 Jane Trotter – of Christchurch; an obstetrical nurse.
 Ninian George Trotter  – of Riverton. For public and social-welfare services.
 Charles Edward Wheeler – of Wellington; a parliamentary journalist.
 Mary Frances Wyber – of Balclutha. For services to the community, especially in connection with the Returned Services' Association and charitable organisations at Balclutha.

Military division
 Hiram William Harris – temporary senior commissioned engineer, Royal New Zealand Navy.
 Captain John Ayto – Royal New Zealand Corps of Signals.
 Major Jack Sloan Berry – Royal New Zealand Engineers.
 Warrant Officer First Class Richard Wilson Heaps – Royal New Zealand Army Service Corps.
 Lieutenant Ellen Marion Pysden – New Zealand Women's Army Corps.
 Flight-Lieutenant Gordon Alan Lee Webby  – Royal New Zealand Air Force.
 Warrant Officer Mervyn Milton Bentley – Royal New Zealand Air Force.

Companion of the Imperial Service Order (ISO)
 Percy Roy Angus  – of Lower Hutt; lately chief mechanical engineer, Railways Department.

British Empire Medal (BEM)
Military division
 Petty Officer Arthur George Cooper – Royal New Zealand Navy.
 Chief Joiner Edward Ernest Dorrell – Royal New Zealand Navy.
 Staff Sergeant (temporary Warrant Officer, Second Class) John Allan – New Zealand Regiment, New Zealand Army
 Flight Sergeant Donald Edward Harris – Royal New Zealand Air Force.
 Corporal Christopher John Lennox – Royal New Zealand Air Force.

Royal Red Cross

Associate (ARRC)
 Charge Sister Phyllis May Aitcheson – New Zealand Army Nursing Service.

Air Force Cross (AFC)
 Flight Lieutenant Donald Miles Hutton – Royal New Zealand Air Force.

References

Birthday Honours
1951 awards
1951 in New Zealand
New Zealand awards